The 2010 Minnesota Senate election was held in the U.S. state of Minnesota on November 2, 2010, to elect members to the Senate of the 87th Minnesota Legislature. A primary election was held in several districts on August 10, 2010.

The Republican Party of Minnesota won a majority of seats, defeating the Minnesota Democratic–Farmer–Labor Party (DFL), which had a majority since the return of partisan elections to the Senate in 1976. The new Legislature convened on January 4, 2011.

Results

Match-up summary

See also
 Minnesota House of Representatives election, 2010
 Minnesota gubernatorial election, 2010
 Minnesota elections, 2010

References

External links
 Color shaded map showing winning margin by district (PDF) from 2010 Election Maps, Minnesota Secretary of State

2010 Minnesota elections
Minnesota Senate elections
Minnesota Senate